Stevan Nađ (23 July 1903 – 15 December 1982) was a Yugoslav wrestler. He competed at the 1924 and the 1936 Summer Olympics.

References

External links
 

1903 births
1982 deaths
Olympic wrestlers of Yugoslavia
Wrestlers at the 1924 Summer Olympics
Wrestlers at the 1936 Summer Olympics
Yugoslav male sport wrestlers
Place of birth missing